Al Smith (1873–1944) was a U.S. politician who served as governor of New York.

Al Smith may also refer to:

Entertainment
Al Smith (cartoonist) (1902–1986), cartoonist whose work includes Mutt and Jeff
Al Smith (playwright), British playwright
"The Al Smith Dinner" (The West Wing), a 2005 episode of the TV show The West Wing

Sports
Al Smith (right-handed pitcher) (1903–1995), Major League Baseball player
Al Smith (left-handed pitcher) (1907–1977), Major League Baseball player
Al Smith (umpire) (1925–2006), Major League Baseball umpire (1964 World Series)
Al Smith (outfielder) (1928–2002), Major League Baseball player
Al Smith (racing driver) (1929–1985), USAC Championship Car driver
Al Smith (ice hockey) (1945–2002), ice hockey goaltender in the National Hockey League
Al Smith (basketball) (1945–2022), basketball player in the American Basketball Association
Al Smith (soccer) (born 1962), retired American soccer defender
Al Smith (American football) (born 1964), former linebacker in the National Football League

Other people
Archibald Levin Smith (1836–1901), British judge
Alfred Leo Smith (1919–2014), Native American substance abuse counselor and religious freedom activist
Albert L. Smith Jr. (1931–1997), U.S. Representative from Alabama
Alfred E. Smith IV (1951–2019), American businessman and philanthropist

Others
 Alfred E. Smith Memorial Foundation Dinner, an annual charity dinner

See also
Alan Smith (disambiguation)
Albert Smith (disambiguation)
Alex Smith (disambiguation)
Alfred Smith (disambiguation)
Alvin Smith (disambiguation)
 List of people with surname Smith